Cusuco National Park is a national park in Honduras.

Cusuco National Park is a  protected area in the Merendon mountains of northwest Honduras. The park comprises a  core zone surrounded by a  buffer zone. Cusuco encompasses several major habitats, including semi-arid pine forest, moist pine forest, moist broadleaf forest and dwarf forest (bosque enano) at elevations above .
 
The park is part of the Meso-American biodiversity hotspot (Conservation International 2006), a region characterised by exceptional species richness.  Cusuco also has great diversity of habitats and high beta diversity in many groups due to the large elevational gradients in the park. Cusuco supports exceptional biodiversity.  Some of the key features of the park include the globally threatened taxa which the park protects - especially amphibians (table 1), Baird's tapir, the assemblage of montane forest specialist birds, jewel scarab beetles, and the globally rare bosque enano (dwarf forest) habitat, which is characterised by Randia brachysiphon.  Cusuco is recognised as a Key Biodiversity Area (KBA) due to the overlapping ranges of several globally threatened amphibian species. The integrity of the ecosystem is threatened by land cover change and unsustainable land management practices – particularly conversion of forest to coffee plantations - by human population growth and infrastructure intensification, overexploitation of large mammals, the amphibian disease chytridiomycosis, and climate change.

References

National parks of Honduras
Protected areas established in 1959
Central American Atlantic moist forests